Ready-to-wear (or prêt-à-porter; abbreviated RTW; "off-the-rack" or "off-the-peg" in casual use) is the term for ready-made garments, sold in finished condition in standardized sizes, as distinct from made-to-measure or bespoke clothing tailored to a particular person's frame. In other words, It is a piece of clothing that was mass produced in different sizes and sold that way instead of it being designed and sewn for one person. The term off-the-peg is sometimes used for items other than clothing, such as handbags.

Ready-to-wear has a rather different place in the spheres of fashion and classic clothing. In the fashion industry, designers produce ready-to-wear clothing, intended to be worn without significant alteration because clothing made to standard sizes fits most people. They use standard patterns, factory equipment, and faster construction techniques to keep costs low, compared to a custom-sewn version of the same item. Some fashion houses and fashion designers make mass-produced and industrially manufactured ready-to-wear lines, while others offer garments that are not unique but are produced in limited numbers. Ready-to-wear clothing has become faster to produce due to advancements in communication technology. In order to track production at distant sites and cut costs even further, some mass-market firms use video-conferencing and other sophisticated technologies to send and receive information, thereby ensuring product quality without the need to travel to the producer. Ready-to-wear clothing and or ready-made garments have truly expanded the fashion industry and all while making clothing more affordable and accessible to all, in all forms of shopping, making for the most convenient option out there.

History

Men's and children's clothing

Ready-to-wear military uniforms were mass-produced in the United States during the War of 1812. High-quality ready-to-wear garments for men became generally available soon thereafter, as the relatively simple, flattering cuts and muted tones of the contemporary fashion made proportionate sizing possible in mass production.

In 1868, Isidore, Benjamin and Modeste Dewachter offered ready-to-wear clothing for men and children to Belgian clientele when they opened the first chain department stores, Dewachter frères (Dewachter Brothers). By 1904, the chain was managed by Isidore's son, Louis, and had grown to 20 cities and towns in Belgium and France, with some cities having multiple stores. Louis Dewachter also became an internationally known landscape artist, painting under the pseudonym Louis Dewis.

Women's clothing
In the early 19th century, women's fashion was highly ornate and dependent on a precise fit, so ready-to-wear garments for women did not become widely available until the beginning of the 20th century. Before, women would alter their previously styled clothing in order to stay up to date with fashion trends. Women with larger incomes purchased new, fully tailored clothing in current styles while middle-class and lower-class women adjusted their clothing to fit changes in fashion by adding new neck collars, shortening skirts, or cinching shirt waists.

The widespread adoption of ready-to wear clothing reflected a variety of factors including economic disparities, a desire for an independent fashion industry, and an increase in media attention. The demand for affordable and fashionable women's clothing sparked designers and department stores to manufacture clothing in bulk quantities that were accessible to women of all classes and incomes. Through the emergence of the US ready-to-wear market, designers like Chanel with their shift dress or the mail-order catalogs sent to rural farms by Sears allowed women to purchase clothing faster and at a cheaper price. The introduction of the concept of "pret-a-porter" has been attributed to Sonia Delaunay after her geometric styles were exhibited at the seminal 1925 Exposition Internationale des Arts Decoratifs in Paris.

Another significant factor created by the ready-to-wear industry was the US development of a style independent from Europe. The US fashion market turned away from Parisian style in favor of an individualized apparel industry promoted through advertisements and articles in magazines like Women's Wear Daily, Harper’s Bazaar, and Ladies Home Journal.

Ready-to-wear also sparked new interests in health, beauty, and diet as manufactured clothing set specific, standardized sizes in attire in order to increase quantities for profit. Women of larger sizes had difficulties finding apparel in department stores, as most manufacturers maintained and sold the limited sizes across the nation.

Overall ready-to-wear fashion exposed women to the newest styles and fashion trends, leading to a substantial increase in profits by US factories from $12,900,583 in 1876 to $1,604,500,957 in 1929. The ready-to-wear fashion revolution led to an expansion of the US fashion industry that made fashionable apparel accessible, cost effective, and commensurable.

Interest in ready to wear was sparked by Yves Saint Laurent, who was the first designer to launch a ready to wear collection, and in 1966 he opened Rive Gauche, his first ready to wear boutique. Whether he succeeded in democratizing fashion is an open question, since few were able to afford his designs, but he did pave the way for ready-to-wear fashion and the cross-fertilisation between haute-couture and high-street fashion that persists into 21st century.

Haute couture and bespoke

Fashion houses that produce a women's haute couture line, such as Chanel, Dior, Lacroix and  Saint Laurent also produce a ready-to-wear line, which returns a greater profit because of the higher volume of garments made and the greater availability of the clothing. The construction of ready-to-wear clothing is also held to a different standard than that of haute couture due to its industrial nature. High-end ready-to-wear lines are sometimes based upon a famous gown or other pattern that is then duplicated and advertised to raise the visibility of the designer.

Collections
In high-end fashion, ready-to-wear collections are usually presented by fashion houses each season during a period known as Fashion Week. This takes place on a city-by-city basis, and the most prominent of these include London, New York, Milan, and Paris, and are held twice a year—the Fall/Winter (FW) shows take place in February, and the Spring/Summer (SS) collections are shown in September. Smaller lines include the Cruise and Pre-Fall collections, which add to the retail value of a brand, and are presented separately at the fashion designer's discretion.  Ready-to-wear fashion weeks occur separately and earlier than those of haute couture.

See also
 Ready-made garment

References

Fashion design